Logical double negation may refer to:

 Logical double negation (logic)
 Logical double negation (linguistics)